Aphodius scybalarius  is a species of scarab beetles native to Europe. It is now considered a to be synonym of Aphodius foetidus (Herbst, 1783)

References

Scarabaeidae
Beetles described in 1781
Beetles of Europe